Puerto Rico Highway 192 (PR-192) is the main access to downtown Naguabo, Puerto Rico. This road extends from PR-31 between Río and Maizales barrios (west of downtown) to PR-3 in Húcares.

Major intersections

See also

 List of highways numbered 192

References

External links
 

192
Naguabo, Puerto Rico